The 2nd Congress of the Philippines (Filipino: Ikalawang Kongreso ng Pilipinas), composed of the Philippine Senate and House of Representatives, met from December 30, 1949, until December 8, 1953, during the second term of President Elpidio Quirino.

Sessions
First Special Session: December 30, 1949 – January 5, 1950
First Regular Session: January 23 – May 18, 1950
Second Special Session: August 1–25, 1950
Third Special Session: December 4, 1950 – January 6, 1951
Fourth Special Session: January 8–19, 1951
Second Regular Session: January 22 – May 17, 1951
Fifth Special Session: May 21–29, 1951
Third Regular Session: January 28 – May 22, 1952
Sixth Special Session: June 23 – July 15, 1952
Seventh Special Session: November 4–8, 1952
Fourth Regular Session: January 26, 1953 – May 21, 1953
Joint Session: December 8, 1953

Legislation
The Second Congress passed a total of 551 laws.

Leadership

Senate
President of the Senate:
Mariano Jesús L. Cuenco (LP)
Quintin B. Paredes (LP), elected March 5, 1952
Camilo O. Osías (NP), elected April 17, 1952
Eulogio A. Rodriguez, Sr. (NP), elected April 30, 1952
Camilo O. Osías (NP), elected April 17, 1953
Jose C. Zulueta (NP), elected April 30, 1953
Eulogio A. Rodriguez, Sr. (NP), elected May 20, 1953
Senate President Pro-Tempore:
Quintin B. Paredes (LP)
Esteban R. Abada (LP), elected March 5, 1952
Manuel C. Briones (LP), elected May 7, 1952
Jose C. Zulueta (NP), elected April 17, 1953
Manuel C. Briones (LP), elected April 30, 1953
Majority Floor Leader:
Tomas L. Cabili (LP)
Minority Floor Leader:
Carlos P. Garcia (NP)

House of Representatives
Speaker:
Eugenio Pérez (LP, 2nd District Pangasinan)
Speaker Pro-Tempore:
Domingo Veloso (LP, 2nd District Leyte)
Majority Floor Leader:
Raúl Leuterio (LP, Lone District Oriental Mindoro)
Minority Floor Leader:
José B. Laurel, Jr. (NP, 3rd District Batangas)

Members

Senate

Notes

House of Representatives

See also
Congress of the Philippines
Senate of the Philippines
House of Representatives of the Philippines
1949 Philippine general election
1951 Philippine general election

External links

Further reading
Philippine House of Representatives Congressional Library

02
Third Philippine Republic